Colorado Sunset is a 1939 American Western film directed by George Sherman and starring Gene Autry, Smiley Burnette, and June Storey. Written by Betty Burbridge and Stanley Roberts, based on a story by Luci Ward and Jack Natteford, the film is about a singing cowboy and his buddies who discover that the ranch they bought is really a dairy farm—and worse, it's subject to intimidation from a protection racket that prevents dairy products from safely reaching the market.

Plot
Tired of traveling around the country performing their music, singing cowboy Gene Autry (Gene Autry) and his Texas Troubadors decide to purchase a cattle ranch and settle down. When they arrive at the ranch purchased for them by Frog Millhouse (Smiley Burnette), they cannot believe that the herd consists of milkcows rather than the cattle they had anticipated.

Soon they find themselves in the middle of a dairy war in which various farmers' trucks are being hijacked and destroyed in an attempt to drive them out of business. The town veterinarian, Dr. Rodney Blair (Robert Barrat), suggests that the Hall Trucking Company is behind the raids and proposes the establishment of a protective association. No one suspects that Blair and deputy sheriff Dave Haines (Buster Crabbe) are in fact the real masterminds behind the sabotage. When Gene vetoes Blair's idea of a protective association, the doctor directs his men to attack Gene's ranch, sending a secret code over the radio station owned by Haines's unsuspecting sister Carol (June Storey).

During the raid, Gene captures Clanton (Jack Ingram), one of Blair's men, and turns him over to Sheriff George Glenn (William Farnum). Soon after, Blair arrives at the jail, kills the sheriff, and frees his henchman. Suspecting that Blair and Haines are involved in the raids, Gene accepts decides to run for sheriff against Haines, and he wins. Gene then convinces the ranchers to contract with the Hall Trucking Company. When he discovers Blair's secret radio messages, he tricks Dr. Blair and his men into an ambush in which the milk trucks are overturned, and the hijackers are caught. Gene and his men emerge victorious in the dairy war.

Cast
 Gene Autry as Gene Autry
 Smiley Burnette as Frog Millhouse
 June Storey as Carol Haines
 Barbara Pepper as Ginger Bixby
 Buster Crabbe as Dave Haines
 Robert Barrat as Dr. Rodney Blair
 Patsy Montana as Patsy
 The Texas Rangers as Texas Troubadors
 Purnell Pratt as Mr. Hall
 William Farnum as Sheriff George Glenn
 Kermit Maynard as Cyrus Drake
 Jack Ingram as Henchman Clanton
 Elmo Lincoln as Dairyman Burns
 Frankie Marvin as Ranch Hand
 Slim Whitaker as Exploding Cigar Recipient (uncredited)
 Champion as Gene's Horse (uncredited)

Production

Stuntwork
 Joe Yrigoyen (Gene's double)
 Jack Kirk (Smiley's double)
 Jimmy Van Horn
 Clem Fuller
 Vernon Harrington
 Jack Shannon
 Ted Wells
 Willard Willingham
 Buell Bryant
 Nick Nichols
 Bill Yrigoyen

Filming locations
 Keen Camp, State Highway 74, Mountain Center, San Jacinto Mountains, California, USA
 Corriganville, Ray Corrigan Ranch, Simi Valley, California, USA 
 Morrison Ranch
 Garner Ranch, Mountain Center, California, USA

Soundtrack
 "Colorado Sunset" (Con Conrad, L. Wolfe Gilbert) by Gene Autry, June Storey, and Cowboys at the end 
 "On the Merry Old Way Back Home" (Walter G. Samuels) by Gene Autry, Smiley Burnette, and The Texas Rangers
 "Cowboys Don't Milk Cows" (Smiley Burnette) by Smiley Burnette and The Texas Rangers
 "I Want to Be a Cowboy's Sweetheart" (Patsy Montana) by Patsy Montana and The Texas Rangers
 "Poor Little Dogie" (Gene Autry, Johnny Marvin, Fred Rose) by Gene Autry (guitar and vocal)
 "Beautiful Isle of Somewhere" (John S. Fearis, Jessie B. Pounds) by Gene Autry and Townsfolk at the funeral
 "Autry's the Man – Vote for Autry" by Smiley Burnette and The Texas Rangers during electioneering
 "Autry's the Man – Vote for Autry" (Reprise) by Smiley Burnette and townsfolk after the election
 "Seven Years with the Wrong Woman" (Bob Miller) by Gene Autry (guitar and vocal)

References
Citations

Bibliography

External links
 
 
 

1939 films
1939 Western (genre) films
American Western (genre) films
1930s English-language films
American black-and-white films
Republic Pictures films
Films directed by George Sherman
Films scored by Raoul Kraushaar
1930s American films